The BOR-5 is a 1:8 sized test flight vehicle, used to study the main aerodynamic, thermal, acoustic and stability characteristics of the Buran. It follows upon the BOR-4 reentry test vehicle.

It was put into a suborbital trajectory by a K65M-RB5 rocket launched from Kapustin Yar, near Volga, towards Lake Balkhash.

Flights

Six flights were made:
 4 July 1984 - aborted
 5 June 1984 - No. 501
17 April 1985 - No. 502
27 December 1986 - No. 503
27 August 1984 - No. 504
22 June 1988 - No. 505

Current locations
Two survivors of the BOR-5 tests are known to exist:
BOR-5 No. 502 - Central Air Force Museum, Monino, Russia
BOR-5 No. 505 - Technik Museum Speyer, Speyer, Germany

References

External links
 
 BOR family page at Buran-Energia.com

Buran program
Crewed spacecraft
Spacecraft launched in 1984